Shooting competitions at the 2018 Commonwealth Games in Gold Coast, Australia were held from 8 to 14 April at the Belmont Shooting Centre, Brisbane.

Medal table

Medalists

Men

Women

Open

Participating nations
There are 38 participating associations in shooting with a total of 282 athletes.

References

External links
 Results Book – Shooting

 
2018 Commonwealth Games events
2018
Commonwealth Games
Shooting competitions in Australia